Richard Cronin is a media consultant and former cable television executive.

In 2007, he started a Los Angeles-based consultancy,  after serving for six years, since May 2001, as president and chief executive of GSN, the Game Show Network.  Prior to this, beginning 1 July 1998 he was president and chief executive of Fox Kids Network and Fox Family Channel.  He led these networks following a New York Supreme Court ruling that he could not take up the new positions until his contract expired with Viacom's MTV Networks, where he was president of TV Land. He had left as president of TV Land in October 1997, after signing with the Saban Entertainment and News Corporation Fox venture.  Prior to launching TV Land, Cronin was Senior Vice President and General Manager of Nick at Nite, and Senior Vice President of Marketing for Nickelodeon.

References

American television executives
Living people
Year of birth missing (living people)